Graham Petrie may refer to:
 Graham Petrie (writer)
 Graham Petrie (artist)